Bergfelde is a railway station in the Oberhavel district of Brandenburg. It is served by the S-Bahn line .

References

External links

Bergfelde
Railway stations in Brandenburg
Buildings and structures in Oberhavel
Railway stations in Germany opened in 1962